The America Zone was one of the three regional zones of the 1956 Davis Cup.

5 teams entered the America Zone, with the winner going on to compete in the Inter-Zonal Zone against the winners of the Eastern Zone and Europe Zone. The United States defeated Mexico in the final and progressed to the Inter-Zonal Zone.

Draw

Quarterfinals

Caribbean/West Indies vs. Canada

Semifinals

Canada vs. United States

Mexico vs. Brazil

Final

United States vs. Mexico

References

External links
Davis Cup official website

Davis Cup Americas Zone
America Zone
Davis Cup